Cholmeley Dering may refer to:

 Cholmeley Dering (died 1836), MP
Sir Cholmeley Dering, 4th Baronet (1679 – 1711), politician and duellist